Tipulimnoea is a genus of crane fly in the family Limoniidae.

Distribution
Australia.

Species
T. woodhilli (Alexander, 1951)

References

Limoniidae
Diptera of Australasia